McWhinney is a surname. Notable people with the surname include:

Agnes McWhinney (1891–1987), Australian lawyer
Glenn McWhinney (1930–2012), Canadian football player
Ian McWhinney (born 1926), English physician and academic
Jeff McWhinney (born 1960), Irish Deaf social entrepreneur and activist
Peter McWhinney (born 1956), Australian golfer
Ted McWhinney (born 1924), Canadian lawyer, academic and politician

See also
McWhinney point
Grady McWhiney (1928–2006), American historian